Block House AG is a restaurant chain based in Hamburg, Germany. Block House restaurants specialize in steaks.

The chain was founded in 1968 by Eugen Block and his sister Marlies Head. It currently owns 53 restaurants in Europe; 42 of which are in Germany, and the others are in Portugal, Spain and Austria. The chain is part of the Block Gruppe (Eugen Block Holding GmbH), which has a total number of 2,600 employees.

History 
The first restaurant opened on September 28, 1968 on Dorotheenstraße in Hamburg-Winterhude. In 1973 Block founded his own butcher's shop. In 1985 Block established the 5 star hotel Elysée in Hamburg-Rotherbaum, which was renovated and enlarged in 2006 and operates today under the name Grand Elysée.

The first restaurant outside Germany was opened in Malaga in 1996.

Jim Block 
In 1973 the brand Jim Block was created to utilize the meat offcuts from Block's steak production. The main product of Jim Block's is hamburgers. Block owns 12 Jim Block restaurants in Hamburg, Berlin and Hannover.

References

External links 
 
 
 Grand Elysée website (English)

Restaurant chains in Germany
Restaurant chains
Steakhouses
Companies based in Hamburg